Wintringham is a village in North Yorkshire, England.

Wintringham may also refer to:
People
 Margaret Wintringham (1879–1955), British politician, wife of Thomas
 Michael Wintringham (born 1947), New Zealand public servant
 Thomas Wintringham (Liberal politician) (1867–1921), husband of Margaret
 Tom Wintringham (1898–1949), British soldier, politician and writer
Other
 Wintringham School, Academy in Grimsby, Lincolnshire, England, named after Tom
 HMS Wintringham, British minesweeper
 Wintringham Specialist Aged Care in Victoria, Australia

See also
 Winteringham, a village in North Lincolnshire, England (similar pronunciation) 
Eynesbury Hardwicke near St Neots Cambridgeshire, site of deserted medieval village of Wintringham.
Graham Winteringham (1923–2023), British architect (similar name)